Jedediah Strutt (1726 – 7 May 1797) or Jedidiah Strutt – as he spelled it – was a hosier and cotton spinner from Belper, England.

Strutt and his brother-in-law William Woollat developed an attachment to the stocking frame that allowed the production of ribbed stockings. Their machine became known as the Derby Rib machine, and the stockings it produced quickly became popular.

Early life
He was born in South Normanton near Alfreton in Derbyshire into a farming family in 1726.

In 1740 he became an apprentice wheelwright in Findern. In 1754 he inherited a small stock of animals from an uncle and married Elizabeth Woolatt in 1755 in Derbyshire. He moved to Blackwell where he had inherited a farm from one of his uncles and, in addition developed a business carrying coal from Denby to Belper and Derby.

The Derby Rib
Strutt's brother-in-law, William Woolatt, employed one Mr. Roper of Locko who had produced an idea for an attachment to the stocking frame to knit ribbed stockings. He had made one or two specimens which he showed to his friends, though he lacked the interest (and the capital) to develop his idea. Woolatt conferred with Strutt, who sold a horse and paid Roper £5 for his invention. Strutt and Woolatt turned the device into a viable machine and took out a patent in 1759.

Their machine became known as the Derby Rib machine, and the stockings it produced quickly became popular. Cotton was cheaper than silk and more comfortable than wool but demand was far exceeding supply.

Cotton mills
Strutt and another spinner, Samuel Need, were introduced to Richard Arkwright who had arrived in Nottingham in about 1768, and set up his spinning frame there using horse-power to run the mill, but this was an unsatisfactory power source. In Derby, John Lombe had built a successful silk spinning mill using water power. Strutt and Need joined Arkwright in the building of a cotton mill at Cromford, using what was henceforth called Arkwright's water frame. This was the first of its kind in the world, marking the beginning of the Industrial Revolution.

Strutt bought land in 1777 for his first mill in Belper, which at that time was a hamlet of framework knitters and nail makers. In 1781 he bought the old forge at Makeney by Milford Bridge from Walter Mather. Belper opened in 1778 and Milford in 1782. For each he built long rows of substantial worker's houses and both are now part of the Derwent Valley Mills World Heritage Site.

In time there would be eight Strutt mills at Belper which would grow to a population of 10,000 by the mid-nineteenth century and be the second largest town in the county.

Family
Strutt was the second son of William Strutt of South Normanton and Martha Statham of Handley near Shottle, Derbyshire, England. In 1755, he married Elizabeth Woollatt. They had five children before Elizabeth's death in London in 1774. In 1781, Strutt married again, to Ann Cantrell, the widow of George Daniels of Belper. There were no children from this marriage.

Jedediah and Elizabeth's children were:
William (1756–1830), who married Barbara Evans, daughter of Thomas Evans (by his second wife), and who invented the Belper stove. Their son was the Liberal politician Edward Strutt, 1st Baron Belper.
Elizabeth (1758–1836), who married William Evans, son of Thomas Evans (by his first wife).
Martha (1760–1793), who married Samuel Fox.
George Benson (1761–1841), who married Catherine Radford, daughter of Anthony Radford of Holbrook.
Joseph (1765–1844), who married Isabella Douglas, daughter of Archibold Douglas.

Jedediah died in Derby in 1797 and is buried in the Unitarian Chapel in Field Row, Belper, which he had built in 1788/9. His final home, Friar Gate House, Derby, is marked with a blue plaque. The house was designed by his son, William Strutt.

See also
Baron Belper

References

Cooper, B., (1983) Transformation of a Valley: The Derbyshire Derwent Heinemann, republished 1991 Cromford: Scarthin Books
R. S. Fitton and A. P. Wadsworth, The Strutts and the Arkwrights 1758–1830: a study of the early factory system (1958).

External links

Jedediah Strutt – a pioneer of the cotton spinning industry in Derbyshire Derby Guide

1726 births
1797 deaths
People of the Industrial Revolution
English inventors
People from South Normanton
English Unitarians
Textile workers
People from Belper